Minister for Health is a position in the government of Western Australia, currently held by Amber-Jade Sanderson of the Labor Party. The position was first created in 1919, in the first ministry formed by James Mitchell, and has existed in every government since, with the minister being responsible for the Department for Health. Prior to 1919, the minister responsible for public health was the Colonial Secretary.

Titles
 17 May 1919 – 15 April 1924: Minister for Public Health
 16 April 1924 – present: Minister for Health

List of ministers

See also
 Minister for Mental Health (Western Australia)

References

 David Black (2014), The Western Australian Parliamentary Handbook (Twenty-Third Edition). Perth [W.A.]: Parliament of Western Australia.

Health
Minister for Health
Health in Western Australia